Rebrov (from ребро meaning rib) is a Russian masculine surname, its feminine counterpart is Rebrova. It may refer to
Artyom Rebrov (born 1984), Russian football player
Ivan Rebroff (1931–2008), German singer
Ivan Rebrov (1890–1938), Soviet chairman
Serhii Rebrov (born 1974), Ukrainian football manager and former player
Serhiy Rebrov club

Russian-language surnames